Bright and Early is a 1918 American short comedy film featuring Oliver Hardy. This short is preserved in the Library of Congress's collection.

Cast
 Billy West as A Bellboy
 Oliver Hardy as The Boss (credited as Babe Hardy)
 Rosemary Theby as His daughter
 Leo White as An honest crook
 Bud Ross as Old man
 Fay Holderness as A Maid
 Ethelyn Gibson (credited as Ethlyn Gibson)

Reception
Like many American films of the time, Bright and Early was subject to restrictions and cuts by city and state film censorship boards. For example, the Chicago Board of Censors cut, in Reel 1, the entire scene of man taking small boy to bathroom and the child's actions outside the room, Reel 2, scene of man in women's underwear where man is peeking through keyhole, man and woman on floor where woman throws her legs up, and the woman on floor showing underwear dropping from her shoulders.

See also
 List of American films of 1918
 Oliver Hardy filmography

References

External links

1918 films
American black-and-white films
1918 comedy films
1918 short films
American silent short films
Silent American comedy films
American comedy short films
1910s American films